The government of Lithuania has made provision for ethnic minorities since 1918. A substantial Jewish group that existed up to World War II was almost eliminated in the Holocaust. The Census of 2011 showed that 15.8% of inhabitants belonged to ethnic minorities: the two largest groups were the Poles and the Russians, although the proportions had decreased since independence in 1989. Other minorities include the Samogitians - not classified in the Census - and the historically important Latvian-speaking Kursenieki.

Independent Lithuania (1918–1940)
From 1918 to 1924 two ministries were specifically dedicated to ethnic minorities, the Ministry for Belarusian Affairs and the Ministry for Jewish Affairs.

On May 12, 1922 a Declaration concerning the protection of minorities in Lithuania was signed at Geneva under the auspices of the League of Nations. Its article 1 stipulated that "The stipulations of this Declaration are recognized as fundamental laws of Lithuania and no law, regulation or official action shall conflict or interfere with these stipulations, nor shall any law, regulation or official action now or in the future prevail over them.".

art.4 §4 Notwithstanding the establishing by the Lithuanian Government of an official language, appropriated facilities will be given to Lithuanian citizens with another language than Lithuanian, for the use of their language, be it by oral way or by written way, before the courts.

World War II (1939–1945)

There was a significant Jewish community in Lithuania prior to World War II, and an influx of Jews from Nazi-occupied Poland in 1941 increased this population to its maximum of nearly 250,000. However, by 1944, the vast majority of this population had been murdered, deported, or sent to concentration camps.

Soviet Lithuania (1944–1990)
In 1989, a Law on National Minorities was voted and a Committee of Nationalities for the Government of the Republic of Lithuania was established. Since 1999, it has been renamed Department of National Minorities and Émigrés.

Independent modern Lithuania (1990–present)
The Council of Europe's Framework Convention for the Protection of National Minorities was signed on February 1, 1995, and ratified on March 23, 2000. It came into force on July 1, 2000. Several other national laws have a direct or indirect link to minorities, e.g. the State Language Law (1995) and the Law of Education (1991, amended in 2003).

According to the census conducted in 2011, about 15.8% of Lithuania's population was composed of ethnic minorities:

The percentage of ethnic Lithuanians has increased from 79.6% in 1989 to 83.5% in 2001; the percentage of Poles has decreased from 7.0% to 6.7%, Russians from 9.4% to 6.3%.

According to the 2001 census, in Šalčininkai District Municipality as well as in the town of Visaginas (which enjoys a special status) ethnic Lithuanians are in minority (10 and 15 per cent respectively).

Samogitians
The respondents in the various censuses do not have the option to choose for the Samogitian ethnicity. This was contested before a court by the Žemaitē bova, īr ė būs ("Samogitians were, are and will be") Association, also named Žemaitiu soeiga, which considers that it is a violation of the Constitution, more particularly of the provision that everyone has the right to decide on his nationality. According to Egidijus Skarbalius, the founder of the Samogitian Party, a new Samogitian autonomist party founded in April 2008, Samogitians could be as many as one million, thus representing a third of Lithuania's total population.

Kursenieki

While today the Kursenieki, also known as Kuršininkai, are a nearly extinct Baltic ethnic group living along the Curonian Spit, in 1649 Kuršininkai settlement spanned from Memel (Klaipėda) to Danzig (Gdańsk). The Kuršininkai were eventually assimilated by the Germans, except along the Curonian Spit where some still live. The Kuršininkai were considered Latvians until after World War I when Latvia gained independence from the Russian Empire, a consideration based on linguistic arguments. This was the rationale for Latvian claims over the Curonian Spit, Memel, and other territories of East Prussia which would be later dropped.

See also
Baltic Germans 
Klaipėda Region
Baltic Russians

References

External links
Minority related national legislation - Lithuania
Minority Rights Group International, World Directory of Minorities and Indigenous Peoples - Lithuania : Belarusians and Ukrainians, 2008
 Moser, Robert. "The Representation of Ethnic Minorities in Post-Communist Legislatures: Russia and Lithuania Compared" Paper presented at the annual meeting of the American Political Science Association, Hilton Chicago and the Palmer House Hilton, Chicago, IL, Sep 02, 2004